Sir Mohammed Anwar Pervez OBE, HPk (born 15 March 1935) is a Pakistani-born British billionaire businessman and former bus conductor and driver. He is the founder and chairman of Bestway Group.

According to the Sunday Times Rich List, in 2020 Anwar Pervez's net worth was £3.1 billion (US$3.75 billion); which made him the richest Pakistan-born Briton in the UK. The 2021 list gave his family's assets as £1.364 billion, placing them 125th on the list.

Early life
Mohammed Anwar Pervez was born on 15 March 1935 to a subsistence farming family in Rawalpindi. He did his matriculation in Pakistan. He studied at Forman Christian College. In 1956, he moved to the UK at the age of 21.

Career
His first job was as a telephone operator in the state-owned telecommunication company PTCL. There he used to work for  a month and most of them were spent on anti-malaria medications.

In 1956, he emigrated to England. There he became a bus conductor and driver in Bradford. He worked seven days a week on double shifts for about - a week.

In 1963, he established his first convenience store, Kashmir, in London's Earls Court for the Muslim community. By the early seventies, he had changed the company's name to Bestway and was operating ten convenience stores in and around West London, mostly serving Asians, and specialized in Asian food: spices, rice, lentils, and meat.

In 1976, Pervez opened Bestway’s first wholesale warehouse in Acton, West London. The company has since grown to a multibillion-pound enterprise, and  Bestway is the second-largest independent wholesaler in the UK. In 2014, his group bought the chain of pharmacies The Co-operative Group (774 pharmacies) for £620 million.

Personal life
He was married to second wife Sabiha Qasim with whom he had Suleiman Pervez, Dawood Pervez and Farah Pervez.  Rizwan Pervez was from his first marriage. Both Rizwan and Dawood are directors of Bestway.

In 2012, their daughter Farah married Syed Abid Hussain Imam, the son of Pakistani politicians Abida Hussain and Fakhar Imam. She lives in Lahore and is not involved in Bestway.

Honours
Pervez was made an Officer of the Order of the British Empire in 1992 and a Knight Bachelor in 1999.

In March 2000, he was awarded Hilal-i-Pakistan by the Pakistani Government for his services to the Pakistani nation.

See also
List of British Pakistanis

References

External links
Bestway

1935 births
Living people
Pakistani emigrants to the United Kingdom
British people of Pakistani descent
Naturalised citizens of the United Kingdom
Knights Bachelor
People from Gujar Khan
British billionaires
Pakistani billionaires
Pakistani industrialists
Officers of the Order of the British Empire
British businesspeople of Pakistani descent
Businesspeople awarded knighthoods
Conservative Party (UK) donors
Bus drivers
Recipients of Hilal-i-Pakistan
British people of Punjabi descent
20th-century British businesspeople
21st-century British businesspeople